Poschmann is a German surname. Notable people with the surname include:

 Agathe Poschmann (born 1922), German actress
 Marion Poschmann (born 1969), German author, novelist, and poet
 Sabine Poschmann (born 1968), German politician

German-language surnames